Italy competed at the 1980 Summer Olympics in Moscow, USSR. In partial support of the American-led boycott of the 1980 Summer Olympics, Italy competed under the Olympic Flag instead of its national flag. 159 competitors, 121 men and 38 women, took part in 88 events in 19 sports.

Medalists

Gold
Pietro Mennea — Athletics, Men's 200 metres
Maurizio Damilano — Athletics, Men's 20 km Walk
Sara Simeoni — Athletics, Women's High Jump
Patrizio Oliva — Boxing, Men's Light Welterweight
Federico Roman — Equestrian, Three-Day Event Individual Competition
Ezio Gamba — Judo, Men's Lightweight (71 kg)
Luciano Giovannetti — Shooting, Men's Trap 
Claudio Pollio — Wrestling, Men's Freestyle Light Flyweight

Silver
Marco Solfrini, Renzo Vecchiato, Renato Villalta, Dino Meneghin, Romeo Sacchetti, Michael Silvester, Pietro Generali, Enrico Gilardi, Pierluigi Marzorati, Marco Bonamico, Roberto Brunamonti, and Fabrizio Della Fiori — Basketball, Men's Team Competition
Marina Sciocchetti, Anna Casagrande, Federico Roman, and Mauro Roman — Equestrian, Three-Day Event Team Competition
Ferdinando Meglio, Michele Maffei, Mario Aldo Montano, and Marco Romano — Fencing, Sabre Team Competition

Bronze
Giancarlo Ferrari — Archery, Men's Individual Competition
Mauro Zuliani, Stefano Malinverni, Pietro Mennea, and Roberto Tozzi — Athletics, Men's 4 × 400 m Relay 
Giorgio Cagnotto — Diving, Men's Springboard
Giorgio Gorla and Alfio Peraboni — Sailing, Men's Star Team Competition

Archery

For the first time, Italy entered a woman in the Olympic archery competition. She placed a respectable tenth place. Giancarlo Ferrari repeated his bronze medal-winning performance of four years earlier.

Women's Individual Competition:
Franca Capetta — 2342 points (→ 10th place)

Men's Individual Competition:
Giancarlo Ferrari — 2449 points (→  Bronze Medal)
Sante Spigarelli — 2405 points (→ 14th place)

Athletics

Men's 100 metres
Pietro Mennea
 Heat — 10.56
 Quarterfinals — 10.27
 Semifinals — 10.58 (→ did not advance)

Men's 800 metres
Carlo Grippo
 Heat — 1:48.9
 Semifinals — 1:48.7 (→ did not advance)

Men's 1,500 metres
Vittorio Fontanella
 Heat — 3:40.1 
 Semifinals — 3:40.1
 Final — 3:40.4 (→ 5th place)

Men's Marathon
 Massimo Magnani
 Final — 2:13:12 (→ 8th place)

 Marco Marchei
 Final — 2:23:21 (→ 35th place)

Men's 4x400 metres Relay
 Stefano Malinverni, Mauro Zuliani, Roberto Tozzi, and Pietro Mennea
 Heat — 3:03.5
 Final — 3:04.3 (→  Bronze Medal)

Men's 3,000 m Steeplechase
 Giuseppe Gerbi
 Heat — 8:37.1 
 Semifinals — 8:27.2 
 Final — 8:18.5 (→ 6th place)

 Roberto Volpi
 Heat — 8:35.6 
 Semifinals — 8:29.7 (→ did not advance)

Men's High Jump
Marco Tamberi
 Qualification — 2.21 m
 Final — 2.15 m (→ 15th place)

 Oscar Raise
 Qualification — 2.18 m (→ did not advance)

 Paolo Borghi
 Qualification — 2.18 m (→ did not advance)

Men's Hammer Throw
Giampaolo Urlando
 Qualification — 72.20 m
 Final Round — 73.90 m (→ 7th place)

Men's Decathlon
 Alessandro Brogini
 Final — did not finish (→ no ranking)

Men's 20 km Walk
Maurizio Damilano
 Final — 1:23:35.5 (→  Gold Medal)

Giorgio Damilano
 Final — 1:33:26.2 (→ 11th place)

Women's 100 metres
 Marisa Masullo
 Heat — 11.77
 Quarterfinals — 11.57 (→ did not advance)

Women's 800 metres
 Gabriella Dorio
 Heat — 2:01.4 
 Semifinals — 1:59.0
 Final — 1:59.2 (→ 8th place)

 Agnese Possamai
 Heat — 2:04.1 (→ did not advance)

 Daniela Porcelli
 Heat — 2:10.7 (→ did not advance)

Women's 1,500 metres
 Gabriella Dorio
 Heat — 4:05.0
 Final — 4:00.3 (→ 4th place)

 Agnese Possamai
 Heat — 4:14.7 (→ did not advance)

Women's High Jump
 Sara Simeoni
 Qualification — 1.88 m 
 Final — 1.97 m (→  Gold Medal)

Women's Javelin Throw
 Fausta Quintavalla
 Qualification — 58.76 m
 Final — 57.52 m (→ 12th place)

Women's Shot Put
 Cinzia Petrucci
 Final — 17.27 m (→ 14th place)

Basketball

Men's Team Competition
Preliminary Round (Group C)
 Defeated Sweden (92-77)
 Lost to Australia (77-84)
 Defeated Cuba (79-72)
Semi Final Round (Group A)
 Lost to Yugoslavia (81-102)
 Defeated Soviet Union (87-85)
 Lost to Brazil (77-90)
 Defeated Spain (95-89) 
Final
 Lost to Yugoslavia (77-86) →  Silver Medal

Team Roster:
 Romeo Sacchetti
 Roberto Brunamonti
 Michael Silvester
 Enrico Gilardi
 Fabrizio Della Fiori
 Marco Solfrini
 Marco Bonamico
 Dino Meneghin
 Renato Villalta
 Renzo Vecchiato
 Pierluigi Marzorati
 Pietro Generali

Boxing

Men's Lightweight (– 60 kg)
Carlo Russolillo
 First Round — Lost to Angel Herrera (Cuba) on points (0-5)

Men's Light-Welterweight (– 63,5 kg)
Patrizio Oliva →  Gold Medal
 First Round — Defeated Aurelien Agnan (Benin) after referee stopped contest in first round
 Second Round — Defeated Farez Halabi (Syria) after referee stopped contest in first round
 Quarter Finals — Defeated Ace Rusevski (Yugoslavia) on points (3-2)
 Semi Finals — Defeated Anthony Willis (Great Britain) on points (5-0)
 Final — Defeated Serik Konakbaev (Soviet Union) on points (4-1)

Men's Heavyweight (+ 81 kg)
Francesco Damiani
 First Round — Defeated Teodor Pîrjol (Romania) on points (4-1)
 Quarter Finals — Lost to Piotr Zaev (Soviet Union) on points (0-5)

Canoeing

Cycling

Ten cyclists represented Italy in 1980.

Individual road race
 Marco Cattaneo
 Gianni Giacomini
 Giuseppe Petito
 Alberto Minetti

Team time trial
 Mauro De Pellegrini
 Gianni Giacomini
 Ivano Maffei
 Alberto Minetti

Sprint
 Ottavio Dazzan

1000m time trial
 Guido Bontempi

Individual pursuit
 Pierangelo Bincoletto

Team pursuit
 Pierangelo Bincoletto
 Guido Bontempi
 Ivano Maffei
 Silvestro Milani

Diving

Men's Springboard
Giorgio Cagnotto
 Preliminary Round — 556.32 points (→ 6th place)
 Final — 871.500 points (→  Bronze Medal)

Equestrianism

Fencing

13 fencers, 8 men and 5 women, represented Italy in 1980.

Men's foil
 Federico Cervi

Men's épée
 Stefano Bellone
 Marco Falcone
 Angelo Mazzoni

Men's sabre
 Michele Maffei
 Ferdinando Meglio
 Mario Aldo Montano

Men's team sabre
 Mario Aldo Montano, Michele Maffei, Ferdinando Meglio, Marco Romano

Women's foil
 Dorina Vaccaroni
 Anna Rita Sparaciari
 Susanna Batazzi

Women's team foil
 Dorina Vaccaroni, Anna Rita Sparaciari, Susanna Batazzi, Carola Mangiarotti, Clara Mochi

Judo

Modern pentathlon

One male pentathlete represented Italy in 1980.

Individual
 Pierpaolo Cristofori

Rowing

Sailing

Shooting

Swimming

Men's 100m Freestyle
Paolo Revelli
 Heats — 52.74 (→ did not advance)
Fabrizio Rampazzo
 Heats — 52.71 (→ did not advance)
Raffaele Franceschi
 Heats — 52.26
 Semi-Finals — 51,87 
 Final — 51.69 (→ 5th place)

Men's 200m Freestyle
Paolo Revelli 
 Heats — 1:52.56
 Final — 1:52.76 (→ 6th place)
Fabrizio Rampezzo 
 Heats — 1:52.62
 Final — 1:53.25 (→ 8th place)

Men's 4 × 200 m Freestyle Relay
Paolo Revelli, Raffaele Franceschi, Andrea Ceccarini, and Fabrizio Rampazzo
 Final — 7:30.37 (→ 5th place)

Women's 100m Backstroke
Manuela Carosi 
 Final — 1.05.10 (→ 8th place)

Women's 100m Breaststroke
Monica Bonon 
 Heats — 1:12.36
 Final — 1:12.51 (→ 8th place)

 Sabrina Seminatore
 Heats — 1:13.76 (→ did not advance)

Women's 4 × 100 m Medley Relay
Laura Foralosso, Sabrina Seminatore, Cinzia Savi-Scarponi, and Monica Vallarin 
 Final — 4:19.06 (→ 5th place)

Volleyball

Men's Team Competition
Preliminary Round (Group A)
 Lost to Cuba (0-3)
 Defeated Czechoslovakia (3-2)
 Lost to Soviet Union (0-3)
 Lost to Bulgaria (1-3)
Classification Match
 9th/10th place: Defeated Libya (3-0) → 9th place

Team Roster
 Antonio Bonini
 Claudio di Coste 
 Mauro di Bernardo
 Sebastiano Greco
 Francesco Dall'Olio 
 Giulio Belletti 
 Fabrizio Nassi 
 Giancarlo Dametto 
 Stefano Sibani
 Giovanni Lanfranco 
 Fabio Innocenti 
 Franco Bertoli

Water polo

Men's Team Competition
Team Roster
Alberto Alberani
Roldano Simeoni
Alfio Misaggi
Sante Marsili
Massimo Fondelli
Gianni de Magistris
Antonello Steardo
Paolo Ragosa
Romeo Collina
Vincenzo d'Angelo
Umberto Panerai

Weightlifting

Wrestling

References

External links
 

Nations at the 1980 Summer Olympics
1980
Olympics